Pseudophilautus bambaradeniyai (Bambaradeniya's shrub frog) is a species of frogs in the family Rhacophoridae, endemic to Sri Lanka.

Its natural habitats are wet lowland forests of Sri Lanka. It is threatened by habitat loss. It is one of the 8 species of rhacophorids that was discovered from Adam's Peak recently.

Etymology
The frog was named after Dr. Channa Bambaradeniya, a leading Sri Lankan scientist and naturalist.

Description
The most striking feature of this species to distinguish easily by the creamy stripe running through the vertebral column from tip of the snout to tail end.

References

bambaradeniyai
Endemic fauna of Sri Lanka
Frogs of Sri Lanka
Amphibians described in 2013